Bicycle drivetrain systems are used to transmit power on bicycles, tricycles, quadracycles, unicycles, or other human-powered vehicles from the riders to the drive wheels. Most also include some type of a mechanism to convert speed and torque via gear ratios.

History

The history of bicycle drivetrain systems is closely linked to the history of the bicycle. Major changes in bicycle form have often been initiated or accompanied by advances in drivetrain systems. Several early drivetrains used straight-cut gears that meshed directly with each other outside of the hub. Some bicycles have used a double-sided rear wheel, with different-sized sprockets on each side. To change gears, the rider would stop and dismount, remove the rear wheel and reinstall it in the reverse direction. Derailleur systems were first developed in the late 19th century, but the modern cable-operated parallelogram derailleur was invented in the 1950s.
 Draisine
 Penny-farthing
 Safety bicycle

Power collection

Bicycle drivetrain systems have been developed to collect power from riders by a variety of methods.

From legs
 Crankset, Groupset, and pedals 
 Treadle bicycle
 Vertical foot motion that mimics that of a climbing exercise machine
 Elliptical foot motion that mimicks that of an elliptical trainer
ElliptiGO
 Swingbike and Risigo that moved the seat and pedals in coordination.

From arms
 Handcycle

From whole body
 Rowing
 Hand and foot
 Exycle: from legs and chest

From multiple riders
 Tandem bicycle
 Sociable
 Conference Bike
 Pedibus

Power transmission

Bicycle drivetrain systems have been developed to transmit power from riders to drive wheels by a variety of methods. Most bicycle drivetrain systems incorporate a freewheel to allow coasting, but direct-drive and fixed-gear systems do not. The latter are sometimes also described as bicycle brake systems.

Direct
Some human powered vehicles, both historical and modern, employ direct-drive. Examples include most Penny-farthings, unicycles, and children's tricycles.

Another interpretation of direct-drive is that the rider pushes directly against the ground with a foot, as employed in balance bicycles, kick scooters, and chukudus.

Rotating
 Chain
 Chainline
 Master link
 Micro drive
 Chainless
 Belt
 Shaft
 Wire rope as in the Stringbike and Rowbike

Non-rotating
 Hydraulic
 Electric, in which turning the cranks generates electricity that then drives an electric motor in the rear wheel.

Two-wheel drive
In 1991, a two-wheel drive bicycle was marketed under the Legacy name. It used a flexible shaft and two bevel gears to transmit torque from the rear wheel, driven by a conventional bicycle chain with derailleurs, to the front wheel. In 1994, Steve Christini and Mike Dunn introduced a two-wheel drive option. Their AWD system, aimed at mountain bikers, comprises an adapted differential that sends power to the front wheel once the rear begins to slip. In the late 1990s, 2WD 'Dual Power' mountain bikes were sold in Germany under the Subaru name. They used one belt to transfer power from the rear wheel to the head tube, a small gearbox to allow rotation of the front fork, and then a second belt to transfer power to the front wheel.

Speed and torque conversion

A cyclist's legs produce power optimally within a narrow pedalling speed range. Gearing is optimized to use this narrow range as best as possible. Bicycle drivetrain systems have been developed to convert speed and torque by a variety of methods.

Implementation
Several technologies have been developed to alter gear ratios. They can be used individually, as an external derailleur or an internal hub gear, or in combinations such as the SRAM Dual Drive, which uses a standard 8 or 9-speed cassette mounted on a three-speed internally geared hub, offering a similar gear range as a bicycle with a cassette and triple chainrings.
 Derailleur gears
 Cogset
 Crankset
 Hub gear
 Continuously variable
 Gearbox bicycle
 Retro-Direct
 Lever and cam mechanism, as in the Stringbike

Control
 Shifters
 Electronic Gear-Shifting System
 Autobike

Theory
 Bicycle gearing
 Gear ratio
 Gear inches

Single-speed
 Single-speed bicycle
 Fixed-gear bicycle

Integration
While several combinations of power collection, transmission, and conversion exist, not all combinations are feasible. For example, a shaft-drive is usually accompanied by a hub gear, and derailleurs are usually implemented with chain drive.

See also
 Bicycle gearing
 Comparison of hub gears
 List of bicycle types
 Outline of cycling

Gallery

References

Propulsion
Mechanical power control
Drivetrain
drivetrains